The Buccament River is a river in the southwest of Saint Vincent. It rises on the western slopes of Grand Bonhomme, flowing west to reach the Caribbean Sea close to the town of Layou.

References
 Miller, D. (ed.) (2005) Caribbean Islands. (4th edition). Footscray, VIC: Lonely Planet.

Rivers of Saint Vincent and the Grenadines